Production system may refer to:

 Computer Animation Production System (CAPS), developed by the Walt Disney Company and Pixar in the 1980s
 Production system (computer science), a program used to provide some form of artificial intelligence
 Production systems, in operations management and industrial engineering
 Subsea Production Systems, typically wells located on the seafloor
 Toyota Production System, organizes manufacturing and logistics at Toyota